Lalatapa is a  high hill in the Jabrayil Rayon of Azerbaijan,  north-west of Çocuq Mərcanlı.

Having a strategic military importance, the hill was one of the battle sites during the First Nagorno-Karabakh War on February 11–12, 1994, following which it was seized by Armenian troops. Lalatapa was retaken by Azerbaijani forces during the 2016 Nagorno-Karabakh conflict, which was independently confirmed by an AFP journalist.

After the 2020 Nagorno-Karabakh war, in April 2021, the hill again entered public discourse in Armenia when opponents of the Prime Minister of Armenia Nikol Pashinyan accused him of ordering a failed operation to capture Lalatapa in early October 2020, resulting in severe casualties for the Armenian side and the collapse of the Armenian defense on the southeastern part of the front. Pashinyan rejected this accusation, saying that the operation was proposed and planned by generals and that he merely moderated the discussion between them. Lieutenant General Samvel Babayan, who was Secretary of the Security Council of Artsakh during the 2020 war, stated in an interview in April 2021 that he proposed the failed operation, but that it occurred some 10 kilometers away from Lalatapa and resulted in only 2 casualties for the Armenian side.

References

Jabrayil District
Landforms of Azerbaijan
Hills of Asia